Rajaji Salai, also known as North Beach Road or First Line Beach, is one of the main thoroughfares of the commercial centre of George Town in Chennai, India. The road connects Royapuram in the north with Quibble Island in the south. Being the main thoroughfare connecting the erstwhile Whitetown and Blacktown, the road has several historical landmarks that date back to the colonial era.

Landmarks

Once the seat of power, Rajaji Salai still retains its importance with several important buildings, including Fort St. George, Chennai Port Trust, Reserve Bank of India, Chennai District Collectorate and the Madras High Court. Half way towards the south, the road borders the eastern end of China Bazaar Road, marking one of the most famous junctions of the city, the Parry's Corner. More historical and heritage buildings are located on important streets around Rajaji Salai, such as the Armenian Church, the Anderson Church, the Gokhale Hall, the State Bank of India Local Head Office building, Dare House and the Collectorate Building. During the regime of former Chief Minister K. Kamaraj, the present subway on Rajaji Salai was constructed, replacing the level crossing between Chennai Beach and Chennai Fort stations.

See also

 Parry's Corner
 George Town
 Transport in Chennai
 History of Chennai

References

Bibliography
 

Roads in Chennai
Streets of George Town, Chennai
Central business districts in India
Memorials to C. Rajagopalachari